Rajko Aleksić (born 19 February 1947) is a former Yugoslav and Serbian footballer who played as a defender.

Career
During his active years, Aleksić played for Vojvodina in Yugoslavia (1965–1977) and Lyon in France (1977–1979), winning the Yugoslav First League in his debut season.

At international level, Aleksić was capped two times for Yugoslavia. He was also a member of the team at UEFA Euro 1968, as Yugoslavia lost in the final to Italy.

Honours

Club
Vojvodina
 Yugoslav First League: 1965–66

International
Yugoslavia
 UEFA European Championship: Runner-up 1968

References

External links
 
 
 

Association football defenders
Expatriate footballers in France
FK Vojvodina players
Ligue 1 players
Olympique Lyonnais players
Serbian footballers
UEFA Euro 1968 players
Yugoslav expatriate footballers
Yugoslav expatriates in France
Yugoslav First League players
Yugoslav footballers
Yugoslavia international footballers
1947 births
Living people